Du Hu (born January 1975) is a former Chinese politician who spent most of his career in Southwest China's Sichuan province. As of October 2014 he was under investigation by the Communist Party of China's anti-corruption agency. Previously he served as the Deputy Communist Party Secretary and Mayor of Pengzhou.

Chinese media reported that Du had close relations with two politicians: Li Chuncheng and Gao Zhijian.

Life and career
Du was born and raised in Pujiang County, Sichuan. In September 1993, he enrolled in Sichuan Finance School and graduated in July 1995. After graduation, he was assigned to Industrial and Commercial Bureau of Dayi County.

In March 2008 he was promoted to become the vice-mayor of Qionglai, a position he held until March 2009, when he was transferred to Chengdu, capital of Sichuan province, and appointed the Chengdu Municipal Party Committee Secretary and Party Branch Secretary of Communist Youth League.

In June 2010, he was transferred again to Pengzhou and appointed the Deputy Communist Party Secretary, Party Branch Secretary, vice-mayor and acting mayor.

Downfall
On October 30, 2014, state media announced that he was placed under investigation by the Communist Party's anti-corruption agency. He was sentenced to 10 years in prison on taking bribes worth 5.79 million yuan ($895,134).

References

1975 births
Chinese Communist Party politicians from Sichuan
Living people
Political office-holders in Sichuan
Central Party School of the Chinese Communist Party alumni
People's Republic of China politicians from Sichuan
Politicians from Chengdu